The Good Old Days: The Love of AA is a 2010 Ghanaian romance film which tells a story about two friends who fell in love with each other from their days of Senior High School. It was directed by Kwaw Ansah and released in 2010.

Cast
Albert Jackson-Davis
Nana Akowa Sackey
Mawuli Semevo
Evelyn Ansah Galley 
Van Hatse, 
Aaron Adatsi
Lois Asare

References

External links
 
 

Ghanaian drama films